Trelewis Halt railway station served the village of Trelewis in the historic county of Glamorgan, Wales, from 1934 to 1964 on the GWR and Rhymney Railway Taff Bargoed Joint Line.

History 
The station was opened on 9 July 1934 by the Great Western Railway. It was situated on a main road next to Ffaldcaiach Bridge. It closed on 15 June 1964.

References

External links 

Former Great Western Railway stations
Railway stations in Great Britain opened in 1934
Railway stations in Great Britain closed in 1964
1934 establishments in Wales
1964 disestablishments in Wales